Gian Matteo Giordani (born 15 February 1984) is a Sammarinese alpine skier. He competed in the men's giant slalom at the 2002 Winter Olympics.

References

1984 births
Living people
Sammarinese male alpine skiers
Olympic alpine skiers of San Marino
Alpine skiers at the 2002 Winter Olympics
Place of birth missing (living people)